In mathematics, and more specifically in differential geometry, a Hermitian manifold is the complex analogue of a Riemannian manifold. More precisely, a Hermitian manifold is a complex manifold with a smoothly varying Hermitian inner product on each (holomorphic) tangent space. One can also define a Hermitian manifold as a real manifold with a Riemannian metric that preserves a complex structure.

A complex structure is essentially an almost complex structure with an integrability condition, and this condition yields a unitary structure (U(n) structure) on the manifold. By dropping this condition, we get an almost Hermitian manifold.

On any almost Hermitian manifold, we can introduce a fundamental 2-form (or cosymplectic structure) that depends only on the chosen metric and the almost complex structure. This form is always non-degenerate. With the extra integrability condition that it is closed (i.e., it is a symplectic form), we get an almost Kähler structure. If both the almost complex structure and the fundamental form are integrable, then we have a Kähler structure.

Formal definition

A Hermitian metric on a complex vector bundle E over a smooth manifold M is a smoothly varying positive-definite Hermitian form on each fiber. Such a metric can be viewed as a smooth global section h of the vector bundle  such that for every point p in M, 

for all ,  in the fiber Ep and

for all nonzero  in Ep.

A Hermitian manifold is a complex manifold with a Hermitian metric on its holomorphic tangent bundle. Likewise, an almost Hermitian manifold is an almost complex manifold with a Hermitian metric on its holomorphic tangent bundle.

On a Hermitian manifold the metric can be written in local holomorphic coordinates (zα) as

where  are the components of a positive-definite Hermitian matrix.

Riemannian metric and associated form

A Hermitian metric h on an (almost) complex manifold M defines a Riemannian metric g on the underlying smooth manifold. The metric g is defined to be the real part of h:

The form g is a symmetric bilinear form on TMC, the complexified tangent bundle. Since g is equal to its conjugate it is the complexification of a real form on TM. The symmetry and positive-definiteness of g on TM follow from the corresponding properties of h. In local holomorphic coordinates the metric g can be written

One can also associate to h a complex differential form ω of degree (1,1). The form ω is defined as minus the imaginary part of h:

Again since ω is equal to its conjugate it is the complexification of a real form on TM. The form ω is called variously the associated (1,1) form, the fundamental form, or the Hermitian form. In local holomorphic coordinates ω can be written

The Riemannian metric  and associated (1,1) form  are related by the almost complex structure  as follows

All three forms h, g, and ω preserve the almost complex structure . That is,

A Hermitian structure on an (almost) complex manifold  can therefore be specified by either
 a Hermitian metric  as above,
 a Riemannian metric  that preserves the almost complex structure , or
 a nondegenerate 2-form  which preserves  and is positive-definite in the sense that  for all nonzero real tangent vectors .

Note that many authors call  itself the Hermitian metric.

Properties

Every (almost) complex manifold admits a Hermitian metric. This follows directly from the analogous statement for Riemannian metric. Given an arbitrary Riemannian metric g on an almost complex manifold M one can construct a new metric g′ compatible with the almost complex structure J in an obvious manner:

Choosing a Hermitian metric on an almost complex manifold M is equivalent to a choice of U(n)-structure on M; that is, a reduction of the structure group of the frame bundle of M from GL(n, C) to the unitary group U(n). A unitary frame on an almost Hermitian manifold is complex linear frame which is orthonormal with respect to the Hermitian metric. The unitary frame bundle of M is the principal U(n)-bundle of all unitary frames.

Every almost Hermitian manifold M has a canonical volume form which is just the Riemannian volume form determined by g. This form is given in terms of the associated (1,1)-form  by

The volume form is therefore a real (n,n)-form on M. In local holomorphic coordinates the volume form is given by

One can also consider a hermitian metric on a holomorphic vector bundle.

Kähler manifolds

The most important class of Hermitian manifolds are Kähler manifolds. These are Hermitian manifolds for which the Hermitian form  is closed:

In this case the form ω is called a Kähler form. A Kähler form is a symplectic form, and so Kähler manifolds are naturally symplectic manifolds.

An almost Hermitian manifold whose associated (1,1)-form is closed is naturally called an almost Kähler manifold. Any symplectic manifold admits a compatible almost complex structure making it into an almost Kähler manifold.

Integrability
A Kähler manifold is an almost Hermitian manifold satisfying an integrability condition. This can be stated in several equivalent ways.

 ,
 ,

The equivalence of these conditions corresponds to the "2 out of 3" property of the unitary group. 

In particular, if  is a Hermitian manifold, the condition dω = 0 is equivalent to the apparently much stronger conditions . The richness of Kähler theory is due in part to these properties.

References

 
 
 

Complex manifolds
Differential geometry
Riemannian geometry
Riemannian manifolds
Structures on manifolds